Dadonghai is the urban area, about two kilometers east of Sanya City. Sanya's beach culture originated at Dadonghai, a congested strip of sand near the city center. There are loads of water sports on offer at Dadonghai.

Gallery

References

External links

Sanya
Tourist attractions in Sanya